The Armoured Vault is a 1914 German silent thriller film directed by Joe May and starring Ernst Reicher, Hermann Picha and Fritz Richard. It was part of the series of Stuart Webbs series, popular during the silent era. It was remade in 1926 with Reicher reprising his role.

The film's sets were designed by the art director Paul Leni.

Cast
 Ernst Reicher as Stuart Webbs
 Hermann Picha
 Fritz Richard
 Arthur Ullmann

References

Bibliography

External links

1914 films
Films of the German Empire
Films directed by Joe May
German silent feature films
German thriller films
German black-and-white films
1910s thriller films
Silent thriller films
1910s German films
1910s German-language films